Docosanedioic acid is a dicarboxylic acid with the linear formula .

Uses 
Docosanedioic acid finds uses in organic chemistry and is a starting material for ultrasound contrast agents.  It is also used to produce the fluffy white solid 1,22-docosanediol, which in turn is a precursor to 1,22-bis-2-(trimethylammonium)ethylphospatyldocosane, a phosphocholine derivative with antifungal activity.

Synthesis 
Disodium 7,16-diketodocosanedioate is reacted with triethanolamine, hydrazine hydrate, potassium hydroxide and a little hydrochloric acid to afford docosanedioic acid via a Wolff–Kishner reduction.

Alternately, 2,5-bis(ω-carboyoctyl)thiophene is desulfurized with Raney nickel to afford docosanedioic acid.

It can also be produced through oxidative coupling of 10-undecynoic acid to docosa-10,12-diynedoic acid and reduction of this intermediate with a palladium catalyst.

References 

Dicarboxylic acids